Kathleen Sekhon (born May 19, 1948) is an American politician and educator.

Sekhon grew up in Pipestone, Minnesota. She received her bachelor's degree in elementary education from University of Minnesota Duluth. She lived with her husband and children in Burns Township, Anoka County, Minnesota. She taught in the Anoka County Schools. Sekhon served in the Minnesota House of Representatives from 1993 to 1998 and was a Democrat

References

1948 births
Living people
People from Anoka County, Minnesota
People from Pipestone, Minnesota
University of Minnesota Duluth alumni
Educators from Minnesota
Women state legislators in Minnesota
Democratic Party members of the Minnesota House of Representatives